Aftab Hussain Siddiqui  is a Pakistani politician who had been a member of the National Assembly of Pakistan from October 2018 till January 2023. He had secured a seat vacant by incumbent President of Pakistan, Arif Alvi.

Political career
He was elected to the National Assembly of Pakistan from Constituency NA-247 (Karachi South-II) as a candidate of Pakistan Tehreek-e-Insaf in by-election held on 21 October 2018.

External Link

More Reading
 List of members of the 15th National Assembly of Pakistan

References

Living people
Pakistani MNAs 2018–2023
Pakistan Tehreek-e-Insaf MNAs
Year of birth missing (living people)